Dieter Wellmann (born 7 December 1942) is a German fencer. He represented the United Team of Germany in 1964 and West Germany in 1968 and 1972.

References

1942 births
Living people
German male fencers
Romanian male fencers
Olympic fencers of the United Team of Germany
Olympic fencers of West Germany
Fencers at the 1964 Summer Olympics
Fencers at the 1968 Summer Olympics
Fencers at the 1972 Summer Olympics
German people of German-Romanian descent
People from Reghin